WLV may refer to:

Wineberry latent virus, a plant pathogenic virus of the family Alphaflexiviridae
WLV, the National Rail code for Wallasey Village railway station, Wirral, England